Pyrimethanil is a broad spectrum fungicide often applied to seeds.  It inhibits methionine biosynthesis, thus affecting protein formation and subsequent cell division.  Pyrimethanil works best on young fungus infestations.

See also

Fungicides
Aminopyrimidines